Pascack Valley is the name for a region of Bergen County, New Jersey in the United States. It is named for the Pascack Brook, which defines the valley. The region consists of eight municipalities: Montvale, Park Ridge, Woodcliff Lake, Hillsdale, Westwood, River Vale, Washington Township and Emerson.

Pascack Valley may also refer to the following locations in New Jersey:

Pascack Valley Hospital, a former hospital in Westwood 
Pascack Valley Line, a commuter rail line
Pascack Valley Regional High School District
Pascack Hills High School, in Montvale 
Pascack Valley High School, in Hillsdale